Waihi Beach Aerodrome  is a privately owned grass airstrip, one nautical mile to the south of Waihi Beach township in the Thames-Coromandel District of New Zealand

References

 New Zealand AIP 4 AD
New Zealand AIP (PDF)

Airports in New Zealand
Coromandel Peninsula
Transport buildings and structures in Waikato
Privately owned airports